Rosemary Mayers Collyer (born November 19, 1945) is an inactive Senior United States district judge of the United States District Court for the District of Columbia, and a Judge of the United States Foreign Intelligence Surveillance Court.

Early life and career 
Born in Port Chester, New York, Collyer received a Bachelor of Arts degree from Trinity College (now Trinity Washington University) in 1968 and a Juris Doctor from the University of Denver College of Law in 1977.

She was in private practice at the law firm of Sherman & Howard in Colorado from 1977 to 1981. She was then Chairman of the Federal Mine Safety and Health Review Commission from 1981 to 1984 and General Counsel of the National Labor Relations Board from 1984 to 1989. She returned to private practice in Washington, D.C. as a partner in the firm of Crowell & Moring LLP from 1989 to 2002.  She was the first woman to serve as the chair of the Federal Mine Safety and Health Commission, as the general counsel of the National Labor Relations Board, and as the elected chair of a major D.C.-based firm.

Judicial service 
On August 1, 2002, Collyer was nominated by President George W. Bush to a seat on the United States District Court for the District of Columbia vacated by Thomas Penfield Jackson. Collyer was confirmed by the United States Senate on November 14, 2002, and received her commission on November 15, 2002. She assumed senior status on May 18, 2016.

In 2013, Collyer was appointed by the Chief Justice of the United States to a seven-year term on the Foreign Intelligence Surveillance Court. The Court provides a measure of judicial oversight over surveillance activities under the Foreign Intelligence Surveillance Act, as amended. Judge Collyer's term on the FIS Court began on March 8, 2013 and was set to conclude on March 7, 2020. She replaced Judge John D. Bates, whose term ended on February 21, 2013.

On December 20, 2019, she announced she would step down early as the Presiding Judge FISC due to health reasons. She was succeeded by FISC Judge James E. Boasberg elevated to preside.

Notable cases
Judge Collyer presided over a number of habeas corpus petitions submitted on behalf of Guantanamo captives.

In United States House of Representatives v. Price (2016), Judge Collyer first found the House had standing to sue the Obama Administration and, then, found that the Administration had unconstitutionally spent billions of Treasury funds on health insurer subsidies without a Congressional appropriation. Judge Collyer enjoined any further insurer reimbursements without a valid appropriation, but stayed her order pending appeal.

Collyer was one of four FISA Court judges who approved a FISA warrant (issued in October 2016 and renewed several times) authorizing the wiretapping of Carter Page.
In December 2019 Collyer issued an order saying the FBI "provided false information to the National Security Division (NSD) of the Department of Justice, and withheld material information from NSD which was detrimental to the FBI's case, in connection with four applications to the Foreign Intelligence Surveillance Court (FISC) for
authority to conduct electronic surveillance of a U.S. citizen named Carter W. Page" ordering the government to inform the court of planned procedures to "ensure that the statement of facts in each FBI application accurately and completely reflects information possessed by the FBI that is material to any issue presented by the application."

References

External links

|-

|-

1945 births
21st-century American judges
21st-century American women judges
Judges of the United States District Court for the District of Columbia
Judges of the United States Foreign Intelligence Surveillance Court
Judges presiding over Guantanamo habeas petitions
Living people
People from Port Chester, New York
Trinity Washington University alumni
United States district court judges appointed by George W. Bush
University of Denver alumni